Celestial cartography, uranography,
astrography or star cartography  is the aspect of astronomy and branch of cartography concerned with mapping stars, galaxies, and other astronomical objects on the celestial sphere. Measuring the position and light of charted objects requires a variety of instruments and techniques. These techniques have developed from angle measurements with quadrants and the  unaided eye, through sextants combined with lenses for light magnification, up to current methods which include computer-automated space telescopes. Uranographers have historically produced  planetary position tables, star tables, and star maps for use by both amateur and professional astronomers. More recently, computerized star maps have been compiled, and  automated positioning of telescopes uses databases of stars and of other astronomical objects.

Etymology
The word "uranography" derived from the Greek "ουρανογραφια" (Koine Greek ουρανος "sky, heaven" + γραφειν "to write") through the Latin "uranographia".  In Renaissance times, Uranographia was used as the book title of various celestial atlases. During the 19th century, "uranography" was defined as the "description of the heavens". Elijah H. Burritt re-defined it as the "geography of the heavens". The German word for uranography is "Uranographie", the French is "uranographie" and the Italian is "uranografia".

Astrometry

Star catalogues

A determining fact source for drawing star charts is naturally a star table. This is apparent when comparing the imaginative "star maps" of Poeticon Astronomicon – illustrations beside a narrative text from the antiquity – to the star maps of Johann Bayer, based on precise star-position measurements from the Rudolphine Tables by Tycho Brahe.

Important historical star tables
 c:AD 150, Almagest – contains the last known star table from antiquity, prepared by Ptolemy, 1,028 stars.
 c.964, Book of the Fixed Stars, Arabic version of the Almagest by al-Sufi.
 1627, Rudolphine Tables – contains the first West Enlightenment star table, based on measurements of Tycho Brahe, 1,005 stars.
 1690, Prodromus Astronomiae – by Johannes Hevelius for his Firmamentum Sobiescanum, 1,564 stars.
 1729, Britannic Catalogue – by John Flamsteed for his Atlas Coelestis, position of more than 3,000 stars by accuracy of 10".
 1903, Bonner Durchmusterung – by Friedrich Wilhelm Argelander and collaborators, circa 460,000 stars.

Star atlases

Naked-eye

 15th century BC – The ceiling of the tomb TT71 for the Egyptian architect and minister Senenmut, who served Queen Hatshepsut, is adorned with a large and extensive star chart.
 c:a 1 CE ?? Poeticon astronomicon, allegedly by Gaius Julius Hyginus
 1092 – Xin Yi Xiang Fa Yao (新儀 象法要), by Su Song, a horological treatise which had the earliest existent star maps in printed form. Su Song's star maps also featured the corrected position of the pole star which had been deciphered due to the efforts of astronomical observations by Su's peer, the polymath scientist Shen Kuo.
 1515 – First European printed star charts published in Nuremberg, Germany, engraved by Albrecht Dürer.
 1603 – Uranometria, by Johann Bayer, the first western modern star map based on Tycho Brahe's and Johannes Kepler's Tabulae Rudolphinae
 1627, Julius Schiller published the star atlas Coelum Stellatum Christianum which replaced pagan constellations with biblical and early Christian figures.
 1660 – Jan Janssonius' 11th volume of Atlas Major (not to be confused with the similarly named and scoped Atlas Maior) featured the Harmonia Macrocosmica by Andreas Cellarius
 1693 – Firmamentum Sobiescanum sive Uranometria, by Johannes Hevelius, a star map updated with many new star positions based on Hevelius's Prodromus astronomiae (1690) – 1564 stars.

Telescopic
 1729 Atlas Coelestis by John Flamsteed
 1801 Uranographia by Johann Elert Bode
 1843 Uranometria Nova by Friedrich Wilhelm Argelander

Photographic
 1914 Franklin-Adams Charts, by John Franklin-Adams, a very early photographic atlas.
 The Falkau Atlas (Hans Vehrenberg). Stars to magnitude 13.
 Atlas Stellarum (Hans Vehrenberg). Stars to magnitude 14.
 True Visual Magnitude Photographic Star Atlas (Christos Papadopoulos). Stars to magnitude 13.5.
 The Cambridge Photographic Star Atlas, Axel Mellinger and Ronald Stoyan, 2011. Stars to magnitude 14, natural color, 1°/cm.

Modern

 Bright Star Atlas – Wil Tirion (stars to magnitude 6.5)
 Cambridge Star Atlas – Wil Tirion (Stars to magnitude 6.5)
 Norton's Star Atlas and Reference Handbook – Ed. Ian Ridpath (stars to magnitude 6.5)
 Stars & Planets Guide – Ian Ridpath and Wil Tirion (stars to magnitude 6.0)
 Cambridge Double Star Atlas – James Mullaney and Wil Tirion (stars to magnitude 7.5)
 Cambridge Atlas of Herschel Objects – James Mullaney and Wil Tirion (stars to magnitude 7.5)
 Pocket Sky Atlas – Roger Sinnott (stars to magnitude 7.5)
 Deep Sky Reiseatlas – Michael Feiler, Philip Noack (Telrad Finder Charts – stars to magnitude 7.5)
 Atlas Coeli Skalnate Pleso (Atlas of the Heavens) 1950.0 – Antonín Bečvář (stars to magnitude 7.75 and about 12,000 clusters, galaxies and nebulae)
 SkyAtlas 2000.0, second edition – Wil Tirion & Roger Sinnott (stars to magnitude 8.5)
 1987, Uranometria 2000.0 Deep Sky Atlas – Wil Tirion, Barry Rappaport, Will Remaklus (stars to magnitude 9.7;  11.5 in selected close-ups)
 Herald-Bobroff AstroAtlas – David Herald & Peter Bobroff (stars to magnitude 9 in main charts, 14 in selected sections)
 Millennium Star Atlas – Roger Sinnott, Michael Perryman (stars to magnitude 11)
 Field Guide to the Stars and Planets – Jay M. Pasachoff, Wil Tirion charts (stars to magnitude 7.5)
 SkyGX (still in preparation) – Christopher Watson (stars to magnitude 12)
 The Great Atlas of the Sky – Piotr Brych (2,400,000 stars to magnitude 12, galaxies to magnitude 18).

Computerized
 100,000 Stars
 Cartes du Ciel
 Celestia
 3D Galaxy Map
 CyberSky
 GoSkyWatch Planetarium
 Google Sky
 KStars
 Stellarium
 SKY-MAP.ORG
 SkyMap Online
 WorldWide Telescope
 XEphem, for Unix-like systems
 Stellarmap.com – online map of the stars
 Star Walk and Kepler Explorer OpenLab: 2 celestial cartography apps for smartphones
 SpaceEngine

Free and printable from files
 The TriAtlas Project
 Toshimi Taki Star Atlases
 DeepSky Hunter Star Atlas
 Andrew Johnson mag 7

See also
Star chart
Astrometry
Cosmography
Cheonsang Yeolcha Bunyajido 
History of cartography
Planetarium
PP3

References

External links
 Star Maps from Ian Ridpath's Star Tales website.
 The Mag-7 Star Atlas Project
 Historical Celestial Atlases on the Web
 Felice Stoppa's ATLAS COELESTIS, an extensive collection of 51 star maps and other astronomy related books stored as a multitude of images.
  Monthly star maps for every location on Earth 
  Easy to use monthly star maps for northern and southern hemispheres. Helpful target lists for naked eye, binocular, or telescope viewing.
 Collection of rare star atlases, charts, and maps  available in full digital facsimile at Linda Hall Library.
 Navigable online map of the stars, Stellarmap.com.
 The Digital Collections of the Linda Hall Library include:
 "Astronomy: Star Atlases, Charts, and Maps", a collection of more than 60 star atlas volumes.
 "Astronomy: Selected Images, a collection of high-resolution star map images.
 "History of Cosmology: Views of the Stars", high-resolution scans of prints relating to the study of the structure of the cosmos.

 

Works about astronomy

el:Άτλας Ουρανού